Sir Geoffrey Miles Clifford, KBE, CMG, ED (16 February 1897 – 21 February 1986) was the Governor of the Falkland Islands from 1946 to 1954.

Life
Clifford served in the British Army in World War I, and then in the Colonial Service in Nigeria. In World War II, he with Imbert Bourdillon, son of Bernard Bourdillon, assisted Philippe Leclerc of the Free French forces in his operation of August 1940 against Douala. He was later awarded the Resistance Medal with rosette.

References 

1897 births
1986 deaths
Governors of the Falkland Islands
Place of birth missing
Knights Commander of the Order of the British Empire
Companions of the Order of St Michael and St George